Bird park may refer to:

 Bali Bird Park, Bali, Indonesia
 Fonghuanggu Bird and Ecology Park, Nantou, Taiwan
 Francis William Bird Park, Massachusetts, United States
 Jurong Bird Park, Singapore - the largest in terms of bird numbers.
 Kuala Lumpur Bird Park, Kuala Lumpur, Malaysia
 Melaka Bird Park, Malacca, Malaysia
Tokyo Wild Bird Park, Japan
 Walsrode Bird Park, Lower Saxony, Germany - the largest in terms of area.
 Bird Park (Mt. Lebanon, Pennsylavnia) - a municipal park in Mt. Lebanon, PA
 World of Birds Wildlife Sanctuary and Monkey Park

See also
 Zoo

Ornithology